Savino is the name of several inhabited localities in Russia:

Ivanovo Oblast
One urban and three rural localities in Ivanovo Oblast bear this name.

Urban localities
Savino (urban locality), Savinsky District, Ivanovo Oblast, a settlement in Savinsky District

Rural localities
Savino, Ilyinsky District, Ivanovo Oblast, a village in Ilyinsky District
Savino, Komsomolsky District, Ivanovo Oblast, a village in Komsomolsky District
Savino (rural locality), Savinsky District, Ivanovo Oblast, a village in Savinsky District

Udmurt Republic
One rural locality in the Udmurt Republic bears this name:
Savino, Udmurt Republic, a village in Kambarsky District

Other
There are other rural localities in Russia that bear this name.